Lauryn Hutchinson (born 12 June 1991) is an American-raised Trinidad and Tobago footballer who plays as a forward for the Trinidad and Tobago women's national team.

International goals
Scores and results list Trinidad and Tobago' goal tally first.

References

External links 
 

1991 births
Living people
Women's association football forwards
Trinidad and Tobago women's footballers
Trinidad and Tobago women's international footballers
Pan American Games competitors for Trinidad and Tobago
Footballers at the 2011 Pan American Games
Footballers at the 2015 Pan American Games
American women's soccer players
Soccer players from Virginia
People from Sterling, Virginia
African-American women's soccer players
American sportspeople of Trinidad and Tobago descent
VCU Rams women's soccer players
21st-century African-American sportspeople
21st-century African-American women